Zelmo "Big Z" Beaty (October 25, 1939 – August 27, 2013) was an American basketball  player. He played eight seasons in the National Basketball Association (NBA) and four in the rival American Basketball Association (ABA). A three-time ABA All-Star, Beaty was inducted into the Naismith Memorial Basketball Hall of Fame as a player in 2016.

Early life
Zelmo Beaty Jr. was born on October 25, 1939 in Hillister, Texas, a small town of 250. He attended  Scott High School in Woodville, Texas and played for Coach John Payton  winning back to back Prairie View Interscholastic League 1A state championships in 1957 & 1958.  For college, Beaty attended Prairie View A&M.

College

Prairie View A&M Panthers

"From 1958–1962 at Prairie View A&M Beaty averaged 25 points and 20 rebounds per game and was a two-time first team NAIA All-American (1960 & 1962). The "Big Z" led Prairie View A&M to the NAIA national basketball title in 1962 and was named the Chuck Taylor Tournament MVP."

NBA

St. Louis Hawks 
He was selected with the third pick of the 1962 National Basketball Association (NBA) Draft by the St. Louis Hawks.  Beaty was named to the inaugural NBA All-Rookie Team in 1963.  He averaged more than 20 points per game in three different seasons, and over ten rebounds per game in six of his seven seasons with the Hawks.  A physical player, Beaty led the NBA in personal fouls in 1962–63 and 1965–66, and tied for the league lead in disqualifications during the 1963–64 season. 

On December 3, 1967, Beaty scored an NBA career high 42 points in a 123-109 win over the Seattle SuperSonics. During the 1969 NBA Playoffs, the first Hawks postseason in Atlanta, Beaty averaged 22.5 points (his highest NBA playoffs average) and 12.9 rebounds in 11 games before, in a pattern familiar for the 1960s Hawks, they were eliminated in the Western Division Finals, the round before the NBA Finals.

During his Hawks tenure, Beaty made two NBA All-Star Game appearances in 1966 and 1968, and helped the Hawks reach the playoffs every season of his tenure. In 1969, Beaty left the NBA to play in the rival American Basketball Association (ABA).

ABA

Utah Stars 
Beaty was legally barred from playing in the ABA by a legal injunction from the Hawks during the 1969-70 NBA season. In his first season in the ABA, Beaty led the league in field goal percentage, was third in the league in rebounds per game. Coached by Bill Sharman and also featuring ABA star Willie Wise, the Stars were dominant in the regular season and finished with the second best record in the league at 57-27. Utah's success continued in the playoffs, sweeping the Texas Chaparrals in the first round, before defeating the Indiana Pacers to advance to the 1971 ABA Finals. In the finals, Beaty averaged 28.4 points and 16 rebounds per game, including recording totals of 36 points and 16 rebounds in a Game 7 win to end the series. After the game, Beaty was awarded the ABA Playoffs Most Valuable Player Award for his role in the championship victory.  

The following year, Beaty averaged a career high (for both his NBA and ABA careers) of 23.6 points per game while playing all 84 games of the regular season. However, that postseason the Stars would be eliminated during a hard-fought seven game series in the Western Division Finals by the Pacers, who Utah had beat the year before to advance to the finals. 

In total, Beaty played four seasons with the Stars, being named to the All-ABA Second Team twice and making the ABA All-Star Game three times, before returning to the NBA as a member of the Los Angeles Lakers.

He also served as president of the ABA's Player Association, as well as union player representative with the Hawks.

By 1974 during his final year with the Stars, Beaty was severely hampered by knee injuries, having undergone six surgeries on his knees during his career. Beaty retired in 1975 with combined ABA/NBA totals of 15,207 points and 9,665 rebounds.  He briefly served as a coach for the ABA's Virginia Squires.

Personal
After pro ball, Beaty worked in financial planning. He also worked as a substitute physical education teacher in Seattle elementary schools. Beaty died from cancer on August 27, 2013 at his home in Bellevue, Washington. He was 73 years old. He had been married to his wife for about 50 years, and had two children.

Posthumous honors
Beaty was selected to be inducted into the 2014 National Collegiate Basketball Hall of Fame class and the 2016 Naismith Memorial Basketball Hall of Fame class.

Host Josh Levin ends every episode of the Slate sports podcast Hang Up and Listen by saying, "Remember Zelmo Beaty." This is a reference to an appearance by Shaquille O'Neal on the Late Show with David Letterman in which the host asked O'Neal about several centers from earlier eras and O'Neal did not know about Beaty even though Beaty made significant contributions to the game on and off the court.

NBA/ABA career statistics

Regular season 

|-
| style="text-align:left;"| 
| style="text-align:left;"|St. Louis
| 80 || – || 24.0 || .439 || – || .717 || 8.3 || 1.1 || – || – || 10.2
|-
| style="text-align:left;"| 
| style="text-align:left;"|St. Louis
| 59 || – || 32.6 || .444 || – || .741 || 10.7 || 1.3 || – || – || 13.1
|-
| style="text-align:left;"|
| style="text-align:left;"|St. Louis
| 80 || – || 36.5 || .482 || – || .715 || 12.1 || 1.4 || – || – || 16.9
|-
| style="text-align:left;"|
| style="text-align:left;"|St. Louis
| 80 || – || 38.4 || .473 || – || .758 || 13.6 || 1.6 || – || – || 20.7
|-
| style="text-align:left;"|
| style="text-align:left;"|St. Louis
| 48 || – || 34.6 || .473 || – || .758 || 10.7 || 1.3 || – || – || 17.8
|-
| style="text-align:left;"|
| style="text-align:left;"|St. Louis
| 82 || – || 37.4 || .488 || – || .794 || 11.7 || 2.1 || – || – || 21.1
|-
| style="text-align:left;"|
| style="text-align:left;"|Atlanta
| 72 || – || 35.8 || .470 || – || .731 || 11.1 || 1.8 || – || – || 21.5
|-
| style="text-align:left;background:#afe6fa;"|†
| style="text-align:left;"|Utah (ABA)
| 76 || – || 38.4 || .555 || .500 || .791 || 15.7 || 1.9 || – || – || 22.9
|-
| style="text-align:left;"|
| style="text-align:left;"|Utah (ABA)
| 84 || – || 37.3 || .539 || .000 || .829 || 13.2 || 1.5 || – || – || 23.6
|-
| style="text-align:left;"|
| style="text-align:left;"|Utah (ABA)
| 82 || – || 34.2 || .520 || .000 || .803 || 9.8 || 1.5 || – || 1.0 || 16.4
|-
| style="text-align:left;"|
| style="text-align:left;"|Utah (ABA)
| 77 || – || 32.2 || .524 || .000 || .795 || 8.0 || 1.7 || 0.8 || 0.8 || 13.4
|-
| style="text-align:left;"|
| style="text-align:left;"|L.A. Lakers
| 69 || – || 17.6 || .439 || – || .800 || 4.7 || 1.1 || 0.7 || 0.4 || 5.5
|- class="sortbottom"
| style="text-align:center;" colspan="2"| Career
| 889 || – || 33.4 || .494 || .154 || .771 || 10.9 || 1.5 || 0.7 || 0.8 || 17.1

|- class="sortbottom"
| style="text-align:center;" colspan="2"| All-Star
| 5 || 1 || 24.6 || .340 || – || .789 || 9.4 || 1.2 || 0.2 || 0.4 || 9.8

Playoffs 

|-
|style="text-align:left;"|1963
|style="text-align:left;"|St. Louis
|11||–||27.9||.443||–||.750||7.6||1.0||–||–||10.3
|-
|style="text-align:left;"|1964
|style="text-align:left;"|St. Louis
|12||–||36.3||.521||–||.597||9.5||1.0||–||–||14.3
|-
|style="text-align:left;"|1965
|style="text-align:left;"|St. Louis
|4||–||38.5||.492||–||.760||13.8||0.3||–||–||19.3
|-
|style="text-align:left;"|1966
|style="text-align:left;"|St. Louis
|10||–||41.8||.493||–||.759||13.1||2.2||–||–||19.0
|-
|style="text-align:left;"|1967
|style="text-align:left;"|St. Louis
|9||–||35.3||.442||–||.785||9.9||1.3||–||–||15.9
|-
|style="text-align:left;"|1968
|style="text-align:left;"|St. Louis
|6||–||39.8||.467||–||.782||13.5||2.5||–||–||21.5
|-
|style="text-align:left;"|1969
|style="text-align:left;"|Atlanta
|11||–||43.0||.432||–||.672||12.9||2.3||–||–||22.5
|-
| style="text-align:left;background:#afe6fa;"|1971†
|style="text-align:left;"|Utah (ABA)
|18||–||38.8||.536||–||.846||14.6||2.4||–||–||23.2
|-
|style="text-align:left;"|1972
|style="text-align:left;"|Utah (ABA)
|11||–||40.3||.552||–||.830||14.0||2.2||–||–||20.1
|-
|style="text-align:left;"|1973
|style="text-align:left;"|Utah (ABA)
|10||–||38.7||.552||–||.827||11.6||1.4||–||–||15.9
|-
|style="text-align:left;"|1974
|style="text-align:left;"|Utah (ABA)
|13||–||36.3||.503||–||.825||10.8||1.6||1.4||0.9||14.8
|- class="sortbottom"
| style="text-align:center;" colspan="2"| Career
| 115 || – || 37.8 || .496 || – || .770 || 11.9 || 1.7 || 1.4 || 0.9 || 17.9

Legacy
The March 16, 2022 game between Maryland Eastern Shore and Coastal Carolina at The Basketball Classic been designated the Zelmo Beaty Game.

See also
 Basketball in the United States

References

External links

Remember the ABA: Zelmo Beaty
Remembering Zelmo Beaty

1939 births
2013 deaths
Basketball coaches from Texas
American men's basketball players
Atlanta Hawks players
Basketball players from Texas
Deaths from cancer in Washington (state)
Centers (basketball)
Los Angeles Lakers players
National Basketball Association All-Stars
National Collegiate Basketball Hall of Fame inductees
People from Tyler County, Texas
Prairie View A&M Panthers basketball players
St. Louis Hawks draft picks
St. Louis Hawks players
Utah Stars players
Virginia Squires coaches